Karelse is a surname. Notable people with the surname include:

John Karelse (born 1970), Dutch footballer and manager
Neeltje Karelse (1926–2015), Dutch track-and-field athlete
Tyrese Karelse (born 2001), South African cricketer